Doop may refer to: 

 Doop (comics), a Marvel Comics character
 D.O.O.P. or Democratic Order of Planets on the television program Futurama
 Doop (band), Dutch duo
 "Doop" (song), 1994 song by the duo

See also 
 Doob (disambiguation)
 Dupe (disambiguation)
 Duplication (disambiguation)